Arron Miles Asham (born April 13, 1978) is a Canadian former professional ice hockey player who played 15 seasons in the National Hockey League (NHL). Over his 15 seasons, he played for 6 different teams.

Playing career
Asham was drafted 71st overall by the Montreal Canadiens in the 1996 NHL Entry Draft and made his NHL debut with Montreal during the 1998–99 season. After parts of four seasons with Montreal, he was traded to the New York Islanders on June 22, 2002, along with a 2002 5th round draft pick for Mariusz Czerkawski. After years of going back and forth between the Canadiens and their American Hockey League affiliate, Asham became a mainstay in the Islanders line-up with his most productive offensive season to date coming during his first season with his new team in 2002–03, when he scored 15 goals and 19 assists for 34 points in 78 games. After four seasons with the Islanders, Asham signed a one-year contract with the New Jersey Devils on August 7, 2007.

After the 2007–08 season, Asham became a free agent again, this time signing a two-year contract with the Philadelphia Flyers on July 7, 2008. On signing with the Flyers, Asham said, "I've always loved the way the Flyers play and I fit in here. They play hard every night. They play tough hockey and I've always admired that. I always thought I should play here and when the chance came up last summer to come here, I thought it was the best place for me and a place where I'd really have a chance to win a Stanley Cup in the next couple of years."

In the 2010 playoffs, Asham scored four goals as the Flyers defied expectations and reached the Stanley Cup Finals for the first time since 1997. His biggest goal came in Game 5 of the Eastern Conference Finals vs. Montreal when he scored in the 2nd period to give the Flyers a 2–1 lead of an eventual 4–2 victory that eliminated the Canadiens and propelled the Flyers into a Finals matchup against the Chicago Blackhawks. Asham netted one goal in the finals as the Flyers lost to the Blackhawks 4 games to 2.

As a free agent that summer, Asham left the Flyers and signed a one-year contract worth $700,000 with the Pittsburgh Penguins on August 20, 2010. During the following off-season, the contract was extended for another year.

During Game 3 of the 2012 NHL Eastern Conference quarterfinals, in retaliation to a hit on a teammate, Asham cross-checked Brayden Schenn of the Philadelphia Flyers in the upper body, and then threw a punch while Schenn was down on the ice. Schenn sustained no apparent injury due to the hit. For his actions, Asham received a four-game suspension, his first disciplinary action from the NHL Commissioner since joining the NHL.

As a free agent from the Penguins, Asham signed a two-year contract with the New York Rangers on July 1, 2012. With this, Asham had played for all 5 teams in the former Atlantic division during his career. On February 10, 2013, Asham scored his first goal as a Ranger in a 5–1 victory over the Tampa Bay Lightning. He is also the only player to score a goal with every Atlantic division team. On May 13, 2013, he scored the series-winning goal in Game 7 of the 2013 Stanley Cup playoffs to push the Rangers into the second round and eliminate the Washington Capitals.

Asham saw limited action with the Rangers during the 2013–14 season, playing in only six games.  He spent most of the season with the Hartford Wolf Pack. The Rangers did not offer to extend Asham's contract and on July 1, 2014, he became an unrestricted free agent, effectively ending his professional career.

In September 2015, Asham signed an amateur playing contract with the Gander Flyers of the Central West Senior Hockey League.

Personal life

Asham's hometown is Portage La Prairie, where he still has many friends and family. He has 4 children: daughters Azilyn and Oceane, and sons Dexter and Cruz. Asham is Métis.

Asham also has his own charity called "Arron's Chance to Play Hockey" (chance2play.com) This foundation's mission is to work in partnership with the community to provide opportunities that will enhance the emotional, physical, social and intellectual well-being of children. The overall goal is to enhance the lives of children and families.

Career statistics

Regular season and playoffs

International

Transactions
On June 22, 1996, the Montreal Canadiens selected Arron Asham in the third-round (#71 overall) of the 1996 NHL draft.
On September 10, 1997, the Montreal Canadiens signed Arron Asham to a 3-year contract.
On August 1, 2001, the Montreal Canadiens re-signed restricted free agent Arron Asham to a 1-year contract.
On June 22, 2002, the Montreal Canadiens traded Arron Asham and a 2002 fifth-round pick (#149-Markus Pahlsson) to the New York Islanders in exchange for Mariusz Czerkawski.
On July 18, 2003, the New York Islanders re-signed Arron Asham to a 2-year contract.
On January 19, 2005, the Visp (Swiss-2) signed Arron Asham.
On August 15, 2005, the New York Islanders re-signed restricted free agent Arron Asham to a 1-year contract.
On July 24, 2006, the New York Islanders re-signed restricted free agent Arron Asham to a 1-year contract.
On August 7, 2007, the New Jersey Devils signed unrestricted free agent Arron Asham.
On July 1, 2008, the New Jersey Devils released Arron Asham.
On July 7, 2008, the Philadelphia Flyers signed unrestricted free agent Arron Asham to a multi-year contract.
On August 20, 2010, the Pittsburgh Penguins signed unrestricted free agent Arron Asham to a 1-year contract.
On June 29, 2011, the Pittsburgh Penguins re-signed Arron Asham to a 1-year contract.
On July 1, 2012, the New York Rangers signed unrestricted free agent Arron Asham to a 2-year contract.

References

External links

 

1978 births
Living people
Canadian ice hockey right wingers
Canadian Métis people
EHC Visp players
Fredericton Canadiens players
Hartford Wolf Pack players
Ice hockey people from Manitoba
Métis sportspeople
Montreal Canadiens draft picks
Montreal Canadiens players
New Jersey Devils players
New York Islanders players
New York Rangers players
Philadelphia Flyers players
Pittsburgh Penguins players
Quebec Citadelles players
Red Deer Rebels players
Sportspeople from Portage la Prairie